Malo Hudo is a settlement just west of Ivančna Gorica in the historical region of Lower Carniola in central Slovenia. The Municipality of Ivančna Gorica is now included in the Central Slovenia Statistical Region.

Name

The name of the settlement was changed from Hudo to Malo Hudo (literally, 'little Hudo') in 1953. The name Hudo is derived from the adjective hud 'bad, poor' and, as in similar names (e.g., Huje), refers to poor soil quality in the region. In the past the German name was Pösendorf.

References

External links
Malo Hudo on Geopedia

Populated places in the Municipality of Ivančna Gorica